Tapyala/Tapiala is a village in the Punjab province of Pakistan. It is located at 32°14'0N 74°53'0E with an altitude of 241 metres (793 feet). Neighbouring settlements include  Nonar, Sankhatra, Bolar, Dillekey, Virokey, Wareng Khord, Depoke, and Lohan.

"Tapyala" is the name of Village and "More" is an intersection of roads about less than a Kilometre away on the west side of the Village. "Tapyala More" (an intersection) is situated exactly on an intersection of two roads, "Narowal-Zafarwal and Nonar-Sankhatra Road". Narowal-Zafarwal road is a historical road which leads to Samba in India, while Nonar-Sankhtra road was initiated in 1965’s war of Pakistan and India. This road was a "Kacha" Track used by Military Troop's movement towards the Shakargharh and Shakargharh Border. Latter on in 1970 the same track was paved with Brick Soling from Killa Soaba Singh (a town on Narowal-Sialkot road) to Mangri (a town on Narowal-Shakargharh road). At this time Tapyala More got some importance, because all the traffic from Nonar and Sankhatra side had to pass this intersection. Keeping in view the upcoming importance of “More” in future, A man from the Tapyala Village named " Haji Muhammad Ali" purchased a piece of land to develop a Grain Mill (Chaki Aata) and he installed a grain mill within a very short period of time. The first stone was laid by Mr. Muhammad Ali toward the development of Tapyala More. With the passage of time, the same man expanded his work by installing some other small units of Rice Mill and Wood Saw Machine. These activities led him to work with some other demanding units of Cotton Expanding Mill and Vegetable Oil extracting Machines. Hence the graph of importance of this "More" raised up within very small span of time. Tonga Stand and Lorry Stand developed here in a parallel time. Increase in number of passengers motivated local people to develop fruit and tea kiosks here. 1982 was the year when Nonar-Sankhatra road changed its shape from Brick Soling to tarmac Road. It attracted the local people to put small number of Vans and buses to facilitate the passengers and to make quicker movement as compared to Tongas.

This was the time when name of the village "Tapyala" associated with "intersection" (More) as "Tapyala More" got its projection to public. With the result, Tapyala More became famous and name of the "Tapyala  Village" got suppression. Haji Muhammad Ali, who laid the foundation stone to develop the intersection "Tapyala More" will not be forgotten in the history of this village.

History and Geography
This mud mound is almost 25 feet high from its mid point and there are four to five natural, seasonal rainwater reservoirs along south and west sides of the village. The road connecting to the village on south side is elevated from the adjoining fields.
 
Hypothetically speaking, it can be conceived that when the man was depending upon the agriculture only, this high mound and availability of water would have attracted someone to settle over here along with domesticated animals. Afterwards, the same settler would have attracted the agriculture supporting manpower to join this place to live together. As the time went on, this settlement started multiplying and fewer inhabitants increased to more. Initially they constructed scattered mud houses roof covered with tree and bushes branches without any confined boundary. They used to keep their animals next to their habitat, some times under the trees and some times in a separate shelter to protect them from the swear weather conditions. By the passage of time, mushrooming of rooms developed and the size of houses started to increase and a confined boundary wall was introduced.

References

Villages in Narowal District